PrP could refer to:
 PRNP, a gene encoded with the major prion protein PrP (Pr for Prion and P for protein)
 Praseodymium phospide, a chemical with the formula with PrP.